The twostripe snake eel (Callechelys bilinearis) is an eel in the family Ophichthidae (worm and snake eels). It was described by Robert H. Kanazawa in 1952. It is a marine, tropical eel which is known from the western and southeastern Atlantic Ocean, including Bermuda, the West Indies, Lesser Antilles, St. Helena Island and Ascension Island.

The species epithet "bilinearis", treated as an adjective, means "two-lined" in Latin, and refers to the pair of stripes along the length of the eel's body.

References

Ophichthidae
Taxa named by Robert H. Kanazawa
Fish described in 1952